"Homer vs. Patty and Selma" is the seventeenth episode of the sixth season of the American animated television series The Simpsons. It originally aired on the Fox network in the United States on February 26, 1995. In the episode, Homer loses all his money in pumpkin futures and must turn to Patty and Selma for a loan. Meanwhile, Bart takes up ballet lessons, with an instructor voiced by actress Susan Sarandon.

The episode was written by Brent Forrester and directed by Mark Kirkland, with David Mirkin serving as the executive producer. Sarandon had wanted to guest star on The Simpsons because her children were fans of the show; she made a later appearance in the series in the episode "Bart Has Two Mommies" as the voice of a computer. Mel Brooks also makes an appearance in "Homer vs. Patty and Selma", and had previously accompanied his wife Anne Bancroft to the recording studio when she had a role in the episode "Fear of Flying".

Chris Turner cites scenes from the episode in describing Homer's characteristic qualities in his book Planet Simpson: How a Cartoon Masterpiece Documented an Era and Defined a Generation. Turner notes that the episode illustrates Homer's impulsiveness, silliness, and "physical stupidity". Contributor Raja Halwani writes in the compilation work The Simpsons and Philosophy that the episode shows Homer's tendency to habitually lie to Marge, and cites Homer's covering for Patty and Selma when they are caught smoking as a positive aspect of his character. The episode also received positive mention from Turner in Planet Simpson, Warren Martyn and Adrian Wood in their book I Can't Believe It's a Bigger and Better Updated Unofficial Simpsons Guide, and Colin Jacobson of DVD Movie Guide.

Plot
Homer invests in pumpkins, but loses his entire investment. Late on a mortgage payment, he tries to borrow money, to no avail. After Patty and Selma receive promotions at the DMV, Homer realizes they are his last resort. They agree to lend him money on the condition that he becomes their humble servant. Homer begs Patty and Selma to help conceal his money woes from Marge, who soon finds out after seeing his IOU note to her sisters.

Homer becomes a chauffeur to earn more money, but is stopped by Chief Wiggum for not having a chauffeur's license. Homer visits the DMV with Marge to apply for one; Patty and Selma are his evaluators. The two mercilessly fail his driving and written test. To celebrate Homer's failure, they light up cigarettes but are caught by their supervisor, who threatens to demote them for smoking on the job. After seeing Marge's dismay at the situation, Homer reluctantly covers for them by claiming the lit cigarettes are his. To thank Homer for helping them avoid demotion, Patty and Selma forgive the loan.

In the subplot, Bart is late for school on the day students choose their physical education classes. When he arrives, ballet is the only class that is available. Despite his initial reluctance, Bart soon discovers he is a talented dancer and is invited to star in a school ballet. After his performance, school bullies chase Bart, intending to beat him. He tries to escape by jumping over a trench but injures himself after failing the leap. Seeing that Bart is hurt from the fall, the bullies leave without pummeling him. Lisa tells Bart she is proud of him for showing his sensitive side.

Production

The script for "Homer vs. Patty and Selma" was written by Brent Forrester and was the first time he received a writing credit on The Simpsons. Executive producer David Mirkin describes it as a very grounded and emotional episode that seems very "sitcomy".

Bart's ballet teacher was voiced by Susan Sarandon, and was designed to look a little bit like her. Sarandon had wanted to guest star on the show because her children were big fans; she brought them with her to the recording session. Due to a traffic jam, she was late for the recording session, but once she arrived, she fell into character and worked very hard on getting her accent accurate. Sarandon would later have a cameo appearance as the voice of a computer in the season 17 episode "Bart Has Two Mommies". Mel Brooks has a cameo appearance as himself. His wife Anne Bancroft had played a role in the episode "Fear of Flying" and Brooks had accompanied her to the recording session. Mirkin realized that Brooks was "dying to do the show" and asked him if he would be willing to do a guest part, and he agreed. Many of the writers were fans of Brooks, and Matt Groening described the chance to have him guest star as "an incredible honor".

The episode was directed by Mark Kirkland who was a fan of Patty and Selma, having previously directed the season two episode "Principal Charming", which also focuses on the duo. When directing the sequences where Bart does ballet dancing, Kirkland assigned the scenes to animators who were familiar with dancing.

Themes
Chris Turner writes in his book Planet Simpson: How a Cartoon Masterpiece Documented an Era and Defined a Generation that the episode illustrates how Homer Simpson is "an organism of considerable complexity". Turner comments, "Homer is carrying the full symbolic weight of twentieth-century America on his shoulders, and no garden-variety doofus could manage that task." Turner discusses a moment from the episode where Marge tells her sisters, "Homer doesn't mean to be rude, he's just a very complicated man", after which Homer breaks a plate over his head and shouts "Wrong!" Turner writes that this "revelatory moment" is illustrative of "several of the best-known aspects of Homer's character: his impulsiveness, his inherent silliness, his evident, even physical stupidity".

In the compilation work The Simpsons and Philosophy: The D'oh! of Homer, edited by William Irwin, Mark T. Conrad, and Aeon J. Skoble, the episode is cited as an example where, as contributor Raja Halwani writes, "Homer is a habitual liar, he lacks honesty." In addition to "lying about his financial losses in investments" in the episode, Halwani notes Homer lied to Marge in "The Front" about "the fact that he never graduated from high school", and in the episode "The Cartridge Family", Homer lied to Marge about getting rid of the gun he had purchased. However, Halwani later highlights positive aspects of Homer's character, noting that in the episode, Homer "pretended he was the one smoking so that Patty and Selma would not get fired for smoking at their workplace".

Reception

Critical reception
Chris Turner wrote in Planet Simpson that the scene where Homer "smashes a dinner plate over his head" is one of his favorite Homer moments. "I'd like to say it's the defining Homer moment, but that would do a grave injustice to the extraordinary dramatic achievement that is Homer J. Simpson", Turner comments.

Writing in I Can't Believe It's a Bigger and Better Updated Unofficial Simpsons Guide, Warren Martyn and Adrian Wood said, "Patty and Selma have rarely been more evil than here — they are fabulously cruel."

In a review of the sixth season of The Simpsons, Colin Jacobson of DVD Movie Guide writes, "Homer’s disdain for Marge’s sisters – and vice versa – has always led to terrific sparks, and “Vs.” provides another great round in their eternal battle. It's hilarious to see Homer indebted to the Terrible Two..."

In Latin America, "Niño Rata", the Spanish equivalent of "Ratboy" (the nickname Homer ascribes to Bart in a scene in this episode), became an Internet meme, particularly on YouTube. The phrase is used to refer to irate, inexperienced and underage fans of such video games as Minecraft, Call of Duty, FIFA, Grand Theft Auto Online and Fortnite; it is also used to designate YouTube users who troll other users in the comments bar.

Ratings
In its original broadcast, "Homer vs. Patty and Selma" finished 38th in ratings for the week of February 20–26, 1995, with a Nielsen rating of 11.1, equivalent to approximately 10.6 million viewing households. It was the third highest-rated show on the Fox network that week, following Beverly Hills, 90210 and Married... with Children.

Notes

References

Further reading

External links

"Homer vs. Patty and Selma" at The Simpsons.com

The Simpsons (season 6) episodes
1995 American television episodes
Film and television memes